Tibor Nagy may refer to:

Tibor Nagy (canoeist), Hungarian sprint canoeist
Tibor Nagy (footballer, born 1962), Hungarian international association football player, coach
Tibor Nagy (footballer, born 1991), Hungarian association football player
Tibor P. Nagy (born 1949), American diplomat